This is a list of schools in Luton, in Bedfordshire, England.

State-funded schools

Primary schools

Beech Hill Community Primary School
Beechwood Primary School
Bramingham Primary School
Bushmead Primary School
Chantry Primary Academy
Crawley Green Infant School
Dallow Primary School
Denbigh Primary School
Downside Primary School 
Farley Junior Academy
The Ferrars Academy
Ferrars Junior School
Foxdell Infant School
Foxdell Junior School
Hillborough Infant School
Hillborough Junior School
Icknield Primary School
Leagrave Primary School
The Linden Academy
Maidenhall Primary School
The Meads Primary School
Norton Road Primary School
Parklea Primary School
Pirton Hill Primary School
Putteridge Primary School
Ramridge Primary School
River Bank Primary School
Sacred Heart RC Primary School
St Joseph's RC Primary School 
St Margaret of Scotland RC Primary School 
St Martin de Porres RC Primary School
St Matthew's Primary School
Someries Infant School
Someries Junior School
Southfield Primary School
Stopsley Community Primary School
Surrey Street Primary School
Tennyson Road Primary School
Warden Hill Infant School
Warden Hill Junior School
Waulud Primary School
Wenlock CE Academy 
Whipperley Infant Academy
Whitefield Primary Academy
Wigmore Primary School
William Austin Infant School
William Austin Junior School

Secondary schools

Cardinal Newman Catholic School
The Chalk Hills Academy
Challney High School for Boys
Challney High School for Girls
Chiltern Academy
Denbigh High School
Icknield High School
Lea Manor High School
Lealands High School
Putteridge High School
Queen Elizabeth School
Stockwood Park Academy
Stopsley High School

Special and alternative schools
Avenue Centre for Education
Lady Zia Wernher School
Richmond Hill School
Windmill Hill School
Woodlands Secondary School

Further education
Barnfield College
Luton Sixth Form College

Independent schools

Primary and preparatory schools
Kings House Preparatory School
Mehria Primary School
Oakwood Primary School
Olive Tree Primary School

Senior and all-through schools
Al-Hikmah Boys' School
Al-Hikmah Girls' School
Jamiatul Uloom Al - Islamia

Special and alternative schools
Active Support Education Centre

References

Luton Borough Council Site

 
Schools
Lists of schools in the East of England
Lists of buildings and structures in Bedfordshire